Serena Williams was the defending champion, but lost in semifinals to Amélie Mauresmo.

Kim Clijsters won in the final 3–6, 7–6(7–3), 6–0 against Amélie Mauresmo. It was the 3rd title for Clijsters in the season and the 13th in her overall career.

Seeds
The first eight seeds received a bye into the second round.

Draw

Finals

Top half

Section 1

Section 2

Bottom half

Section 3

Section 4

References
 Main and Qualifying Draws

Women's Singles
Italian Open - Singles